Corey Stewart is an Australian former professional rugby league footballer who played in the 1990s in the NSWRL Competition.

Stewart began his Australian Rugby League career with Eastern Suburbs in 1990.

In 1993 Stewart joined the Penrith Panthers club. After leaving the Panthers, Stewart moved to Eden, New South Wales, where he later played for the Eden Tigers in the Group 16 Rugby League competition.

Stewart is the son of Bruce 'Larpa' Stewart who played for the club in the late 1960s.

References

Living people
Australian rugby league players
Indigenous Australian rugby league players
Penrith Panthers players
Sydney Roosters players
Year of birth missing (living people)
Rugby league wingers
Rugby league halfbacks
Rugby league fullbacks
Rugby league players from Sydney